T Persei is a red supergiant located in the constellation Perseus.  It varies in brightness between magnitudes 8.3 and 9.7 and is considered to be a member of the Double Cluster.

T Persei is a member of the Perseus OB1 association around the h and χ Persei open clusters, around 2 degrees north of the centre of the clusters.  It is generally treated as an outlying member of the clusters.  It lies half a degree away from S Persei, another red supergiant Double Cluster member.

T Per is a semiregular variable star, whose brightness varies from magnitude 8.34 to 9.7 over a period of 2,430 days.  Unlike many red supergiants, it does not appear to have a long secondary period. It is relatively inactive for the red supergiant star, with low mass loss rate /year and no detectable dust shell.

This is derived from Hipparcos measurements. However, no other sources report a companion.

References

M-type supergiants
Perseus (constellation)
Persei, T
014142
Semiregular variable stars
010829
BD+58 439
J02192186+5857403